Qeshlaq-e Hajjiabad-e Olya (also Romanized as Qeshlāq-e Ḩājjīābād-e ‘Olyā; also known as Qeshlāq-e Ḩājjīābād and Qeshlāq-e Ḩājjīābād-e Bālā) is a village in Sagezabad Rural District, in the Central District of Buin Zahra County, Qazvin Province, Iran. At the 2006 census, its population was 94, in 21 families.

References 

Populated places in Buin Zahra County